Xunlight Corporation was a venture-backed advanced technology company that specialized in the development of high-performance, flexible, and lightweight solar modules. Founded in 2002, the company was established to commercialize solar technology that was developed the University of Toledo's Thin Film Silicon Photovoltaic Laboratory. Xunlight used a high-speed roll-to-roll manufacturing process to develop thin-film silicon-based photovoltaic solutions. In 2014, the company filed for bankruptcy.

History

2002-2007: From Founding to Factory

January 2002

Midwest Optoelectronics, LLC (MWOE) was established to commercialize technologies developed at the University of Toledo.

May 2003

MWOE receives its first grant from DOE SBIR.

January 2006

MWOE and UT reach an exclusive license agreement for four sets of technology portfolios developed in the Thin Film Silicon Photovoltaic Laboratory.

April 2006

Xunlight (aka: MWOE Solar) was formed and all MWOE operations were reorganized into Xunlight.

May 2007

Xunlight receives Series A investment of $7 million.

July 2007

Xunlight moves its headquarters from the incubator at the University of Toledo to a 122,000 sq. ft. manufacturing facility at 3145 Nebraska Ave.

2008

April

Xunlight receives Series B investment of $33 million.

June

Xunlight receives $5 million grant from Ohio Department of Development.

Xunlight demonstrates first solar cell deposition on 2MW roll-to-roll pilot production line.

December

Xunlight receives $7 million loan from the State of Ohio.

2009

June

Xunlight successfully completes the installation and demonstration of its 25MW high-throughput, wide-web, roll-to-roll photovoltaic manufacturing process.
Xunlight (Kunshan) Co., Ltd is established as Xunlight`s China factory.

September

Xunlight delivers and installs its first shipment of solar modules to its first customer, the University of Toledo.

2014 to 2017
Xunlight`s products are available from Xunlight (Kunshan) factory.  T
Xunlight offers two main kinds of products for customers` option. Its power range is from 25 W to 300 W, with weight range between 1 kg and 12 kg. 
 Roll-out Thin Film Solar Panel (Suitable for special roof-top, bus shelters, solar tent/camp, LED Light Pole)
 Portable/ Foldable Thin Film Solar Panel (Solar Power Bag, suitable for outdoor activities)
 
Xunlight products are characterized with flexibility, light weight, excellent low-light performance and temperature coefficient, durable usage and easy installation. Therefore, they are  particularly suitable for special roof-top, bus shelter, solar tent/camp, LED light pole, solar umbrella  and outdoors activities.

References

Solar energy companies of the United States